Makrauli railway station is a station on the Panipat–Rohtak line. It is located in the Indian state of Haryana. It serves Makrauli and surrounding area.

See also
 List of railway stations in Haryana

References

Railway stations in Rohtak district
Railway stations in Haryana